Gem Lake is a lake located on Vancouver Island north east of Mount Albert Edward on the east side of Buttle Lake, in Strathcona Provincial Park.

References

Alberni Valley
Lakes of Vancouver Island
Comox Land District